The Polyphysaceae is a taxonomic family of green algae, one of three families in the order Dasycladales. For single-celled organisms, they are huge, growing to nearly a foot long in some cases.

References

External links

Dasycladales
Ulvophyceae families